Frances Laughlin Wadsworth (1909-1978) was an American sculptor active in Hartford, Connecticut.

Wadsworth was born in Buffalo, New York, on June 11, 1909.  Her parents were Frank and Martha Laughlin.  Wadsworth graduated from St. Catherine's School (Richmond, Virginia) in 1927, from which she received the Distinguished Alumna Award in 1970. She also trained in Europe.

Wadsworth moved to Hartford when she married Robert Wadsworth, an executive at Travelers Insurance.  Hartford was then considered the insurance capital of the United States.  Robert was also a direct descendant of Daniel Wadsworth, who had created the Wadsworth Atheneum, the first public art museum in the United States.  However, at the time of Frances and Robert's marriage, the Wadsworth family was no longer involved in the administration of the Museum.

Frances Wadsworth was commissioned to produce a number of pieces of public art in Connecticut.  She also served as Fine Art Instructor at the Institute of Living in Hartford, as part of an initiative to introduce art therapy for patients.

Selected works 

 Thomas Hooker statue, 1938
 Brother and Sister, Institute of Living, Hartford, 1949
 Thomas Hooker statue, Hartford, 1950
 Alice Cogswell statue (American School for the Deaf Founders Memorial), Hartford, 1952
 The Safe Arrival, Hartford, 1964
 The Young President, 1964
 Day Dreams, date unknown
 Love, date unknown
 "The peer status of sixth and seventh grade children", New York, Bureau of Publications, Teachers College, Columbia University, 1954.
 Robert Kennedy, 1966

References 

 Doris Estelle Cook, Hartford's Most Visible Sculptor: Frances L. Wadsworth, Connecticut Historical Society, 1988.
 Institute of Living, Annual Report, 1950.
 Smithsonian Institution: Siris art database
 St. Catherine's School: Distinguished Alumna Award
Karen DePauw," Frances Laughlin Wadsworth: Sculpting the Past", April 24, 2014. https://connecticuthistory.org/frances-laughlin-wadsworth-sculpting-the-past/

20th-century American sculptors
1909 births
1978 deaths
Artists from Buffalo, New York